The Federal Court of Australia is an Australian superior court of record which has jurisdiction to deal with most civil disputes governed by federal law (with the exception of family law matters), along with some summary (less serious) and indictable (more serious) criminal matters. Cases are heard at first instance by single judges. The court includes an appeal division referred to as the Full Court comprising three judges, the only avenue of appeal from which lies to the High Court of Australia. In the Australian court hierarchy, the Federal Court occupies a position equivalent to the supreme courts of each of the states and territories. In relation to the other courts in the federal stream, it is superior to the Federal Circuit and Family Court of Australia for all jurisdictions except family law. It was established in 1976 by the Federal Court of Australia Act.

The Chief Justice of the Federal Court is James Allsop.

Jurisdiction

The Federal Court has no inherent jurisdiction.  Its jurisdiction flows from statute. The Court's original jurisdiction include matters arising from Commonwealth legislation such as, for example, matters relating to taxation, trade practices, native title, intellectual property, industrial relations, corporations, immigration and bankruptcy.

The Federal Court of Australia also has appellate jurisdiction from Division 2 of the Federal Circuit and Family Court of Australia on all general federal law matters (family law matters are appealed to Division 1 of that Court). The Court also exercises general appellate jurisdiction in criminal and civil matters on appeal from the Supreme Court of Norfolk Island; and exercises appellate jurisdiction in appeals from state supreme courts in some federal matters. Other federal courts and tribunals where the Court exercises  appellate jurisdiction include the Australian Sports Anti-Doping Authority and the Australian Human Rights and Equal Opportunity Commission.

The Court has concurrent jurisdiction with the Australian Capital Territory Supreme Court and Northern Territory Supreme Court over civil matters arising under those Territories' laws.

It also has the power to interpret the Constitution.

Related courts
The jurisdiction of the Federal Court of Australia includes the jurisdiction previously exercised by three former federal courts, the Federal Court of Bankruptcy, Commonwealth Industrial Court and Industrial Relations Court of Australia.

Federal Court of Bankruptcy
The Federal Court of Bankruptcy had jurisdiction in bankruptcy matters and was created in 1930. The jurisdiction in bankruptcy was transferred to the Federal Court of Australia on its establishment in 1977.

Commonwealth Industrial Court
The Commonwealth Industrial Court was established in 1956 as a result of the Boilermaker's case, where the High Court held that a Chapter III Court could not exercise a non-judicial power, the arbitral function, because of the constitutional separation of powers in Australia. The judicial functions were given to the newly created Commonwealth Industrial Court and the arbitral functions were given to Commonwealth Conciliation and Arbitration Commission.

The court was renamed the Australian Industrial Court in 1973. In 1977 the jurisdiction of the Australian Industrial Court was transferred to the Federal Court of Australia.

Industrial Relations Court of Australia

In 1993 the industrial relations jurisdiction of the Federal Court of Australia was transferred to the Industrial Relations Court of Australia, and transferred back to the Federal Court of Australia in 1996. The last judge of the Industrial Relations Court, Anthony North, retired in September 2018. The court was formally abolished on 1 March 2021.

Current judges

See also
Commonwealth Law Courts
Law Courts Building, Sydney
List of judges of the Federal Court of Australia
List of Federal Court of Australia cases

References

External links
 Federal Court of Australia

 
Courts and tribunals established in 1976
1976 establishments in Australia